Annabel Hartlett, known by her stage name Godlands, is an Australian DJ, songwriter, and music producer. Godlands has performed at many Australian music festivals and events including: Festival X 2019, Party In The Paddock, This That, Alison Wonderland's Scarehouse Project, Wildlands, Factory Presents, Touch Bass, and Spilt Milk. Godlands is signed to Steve Aoki's record label Dim Mak Records, and United Talent Agency.

Discography

Extended plays
4 U Only (2019)
Ready 2 Rage (2021)
GODSP33D (2022)

Singles
2017
 "Finally"
 "Hit Em Like This"

2018
 "Everybody Knows"
 "Pleasures"
 "Wild"
 "Horses" ft Jessica Lamont
 "2 Clips"

2019
 "Valour" (featuring Boi)
 "Back Now"
 "Lowkey" (with Nxsty, featuring Lil Traffic)
 "Hellraiser"

2020
 "Drop It Low" (featuring Yung Bambi) 
 "Smoke Em Up" (featuring SAMPLEGOD)
"JOHNNY" 

2022
 "GODSP33D"
 "Tell Me"(with Tisoki)

Personal life 
She is the sister of AFL players Hamish Hartlett and Adam Hartlett (formerly ). She was educated at Sacred Heart College.

References

Australian DJs
Living people
Year of birth missing (living people)
Australian record producers
Musicians from Adelaide
Dim Mak Records artists
Monstercat artists
Electronic dance music DJs
Trap musicians (EDM)
Women DJs
People educated at Sacred Heart College, Adelaide